Richard L. Jefferies (born March 1956) is an American screenwriter, film producer, film director and editor.  He wrote and executive produced Cold Creek Manor.  He was a screenwriter on Tron Legacy for Disney Studios and directed the 2008 Syfy Original film Living Hell. Jefferies partners with writer/director/producer Ethan Wiley in transmedia production company Wiseacre Films.

Career 
Jefferies' father was a movie theater manager. He studied from 1974 to 1978 at California Institute of the Arts. Together with Mark Kirkland he won a Student Academy Award for his animated short film Fame about a song by David Bowie. After his studies he founded New Hollywood Inc. together with David Koenigsberg, Osvaldo Zornizer and Mark Kirkland.

His work on Fantastic Four: Rise of the Silver Surfer and Tron: Legacy was not credited.

Filmography 
 1982: Blood Tide
 1984: Action Impossible
 1988: 14 Going on 30
 1988: Scarecrows
 1992: The Vagrant
 1995: Man of the House
 2003: Cold Creek Manor
 2007: Fantastic Four: Rise of the Silver Surfer
 2008: Living Hell
 2010: Tron: Legacy
 2012: Elf-Man
Canceled: adaptation of Dean Koontz's novel The Bad Place
Canceled: Sonic: Wonders of the World

References

External links 

American male screenwriters
Living people
1956 births